Life Starts Now is the third studio album by the Canadian rock band Three Days Grace. The album was released on September 22, 2009. It was produced by Howard Benson. It was the second time in a row that the band has worked with him, after the commercially successful One-X. Life Starts Now expresses a lighter lyrical mood compared to the previous album. It is the first Three Days Grace album to be released by Sony Music Entertainment and the last to be released by Jive Records, as Sony disbanded the label in 2011.

Background and production
After being on the road for five years with Three Days Grace, the bass guitarist, Brad Walst, said, "We all came home and got a hard dose of life," which the band then used to create a more "musically in-depth and personal album". He described Life Starts Now as a record about "confronting life and how fragile it can be". Speaking about the album, the guitarist, Barry Stock, said, "This time around we really wanted to go with something different than what we've done in the past."

Pre-production began in January 2009 while the band began recording the music at The Warehouse Studio in Vancouver that March. The album was completed in August the same year. The group unveiled the cover art for Life Starts Now on August 19, 2009. After finalizing all aspects of the album, they officially announced that the album would be released on September 22, 2009.

The group embarked on the "Life Starts Now Tour" in 2010 to support the album. They also supported Nickelback on the "Dark Horse Tour" in 2010 and Avenged Sevenfold on the "Welcome to the Family Tour" in 2011.

Sales
The album debuted at number three on the Billboard 200, selling 79,000 copies in the US in its first week, thus becoming the band's highest-charting album in the US to date. The album also debuted on the Billboard Top Rock Albums chart at number two, along with "Break" which peaked at number one on the Billboard Rock Songs chart and "The Good Life" at number 52 on the Canadian Hot 100 and number one on Billboard Rock Songs chart. With the exception of "Lost in You", all of the band's singles from the album topped the Billboard rock song charts. In July 2010, the album had sold 398,826 units in the US.

Reception

Upon its release, Life Starts Now received mixed reviews from music critics. The AllMusic reviewer, James Christopher Monger, who gave the album three out of five stars, wrote, "Life Starts Now continues the theme of One-X, Gontier's personal demons, but with a hint of sunlight." He complimented the album, writing that it "treats the well-worn metal themes of anger, isolation, heartache, and redemption with the kind of begrudging respect they deserve, pumping out a competent flurry of fist-bump anthems and world-weary, mid-tempo rockers". Sputnikmusic gave the album a mixed review calling the album "rehash number two". A negative review came from the About.com reviewer, Tim Grierson, who wrote, "The problem isn't that Life Starts Now doesn't have good songs — the problem is that there aren't enough of them and that even the strongest moments feel overly familiar. Frontman Adam Gontier continues to expose his tortured soul, but without consistently gripping tunes to back up his anguish, Three Days Grace seem stuck in their misery rather than transcending it."

Accolades
The album was nominated for "Best Rock Album" at the 2010 Juno awards. It won the "Favorite New Album" award at the 2010 Casby Awards. The album was officially certified Platinum in Canada and Gold in the US on March 1, 2011, and Platinum on February 12, 2018.

Track listing

Personnel

Three Days Grace
 Adam Gontier – lead vocals, rhythm guitar
 Neil Sanderson – drums, keyboards, backing vocals
 Brad Walst – bass guitar, backing vocals 
 Barry Stock – lead guitar

Artwork
 Danny Clinch – photography
 Chris Feldman – art direction, design
 Jackie Murphy – art direction
 Adrian Knopik – illustration
 
Additional musicians
 Howard Benson – keyboards, programming

Production
 Howard Benson – producer
 Mike Cashin – assistant engineer
 Chris Lord-Alge – mixing
 Ted Jensen – mastering
 Paul DeCarli – digital editing
 Jon Nicholson – drum technician
 Hatsukazu "Hatch" Inagaki – engineers
 Mike Plotnikoff – engineers
 Andrew Schubert – engineers
 Brad Townsend – engineers
 Marc VanGool – guitar technician

Management
Michael Tedesco – A&R

Charts

Weekly charts

Year-end charts

Certifications

References

2009 albums
Albums produced by Howard Benson
Albums recorded at The Warehouse Studio
Jive Records albums
Three Days Grace albums
Zomba Group of Companies albums